Presentation High School is a private, Catholic, college preparatory school for girls established in 1962. It is owned and run by the Sisters of the Presentation, and operates within the Diocese of San Jose in California. The school is located in the Willow Glen area of San Jose, California, United States. Students come to Presentation from 154 different schools in 62 zip codes around the Bay Area. On top of being superior in academics, Presentation High School also offers more than 60 diverse clubs, teams, programs and affinity groups for its students to choose from. The Robotics Club (Team 2135) is recognized by the FIRST Robotics Competition. This helps young women explore the STEM fields by hands-on engineering, programming and design.

Athletics
The following sports are offered at Presentation:

Basketball
Competitive Dance
Cross country
Field hockey
Golf
Lacrosse
Soccer
Softball
Swimming & diving
Tennis
Track and field
Volleyball
Water polo

Notable alumni
Danielle Slaton, USA Olympic soccer player 
Aly Wagner, USA Olympic soccer player
Jennifer Joines, USA Olympic indoor volleyball player
Jennifer Cihi, Singer (Broadway, Television)
Candi Milo, voice actress

Notes and references

External links

Presentation Sisters of San Francisco

Girls' schools in California
Catholic secondary schools in California
Roman Catholic Diocese of San Jose in California
High schools in San Jose, California
Educational institutions established in 1962
1962 establishments in California